Jürg Hornisberger is a former Swiss curler. He is one of the most international titled Swiss male curlers.

Teams

References

External links
 

Swiss male curlers
World curling champions
European curling champions
Swiss curling champions